Ryan Craig Matthew Smith (born 10 November 1986) is an English footballer.

Career

Arsenal
An England youth international, Smith started his career at Arsenal. He made his Arsenal debut against Rotherham United on 28 October 2003 at the age of 16. Arsenal won the tie 9–8 on penalties with Smith converting his spot kick. He also managed to start against Wolverhampton Wanderers and Middlesbrough. All of the six matches in which he played for Arsenal were in the League Cup, including a game on 9 November 2004 against Everton which saw him go off injured after 20 minutes.

Leicester City
On 30 September 2005, Smith was signed by Leicester City on loan for the whole of the 2005–06 season. He scored his first career goal in a 4–2 win over Sheffield United. He returned to Arsenal on 10 March 2006.

Derby County
On 4 August 2006, Smith agreed personal terms on a 3-year contract with Championship outfit Derby County. He made his debut in a 2–2 draw against Southampton on 6 August. After struggling to adapt and break into a Derby side pushing for promotion, plus the arrival of several midfielders in the January transfer window, Smith was sold.

Millwall
Smith moved on loan to League One side Millwall on 21 March 2007 on an initial one-month loan deal, but this was extended on 17 April 2007 to run until the end of the 2006–07 season. Smith impressed during his time on loan at Millwall and manager Willie Donachie expressed an interest in retaining the youngster's services. In July 2007 Millwall paid £150,000 for Smith, who signed a two-year contract with the club.

Southampton
On 3 October 2008, he joined Southampton initially on a three-month loan. The transfer became permanent on 1 January 2009, when Smith signed a 6-month contract. He was released by Southampton on 2 May 2009.

Crystal Palace
On 26 August 2009, he signed a contract with Crystal Palace. He made his Crystal Palace first team debut on 27 August in the 2–0 League Cup defeat to Manchester City coming on as a substitute in the second half. He left on 25 January 2010 after coming to the end of his short-term contract.

Kansas City Wizards/Sporting KC
On 27 January, Smith joined Grimsby Town on trial, playing for The Mariners in a behind the closed doors friendly against Hull City at Blundell Park. On 2 February 2010, it was reported that Smith would join Kansas City Wizards on trial during their preseason training camp in Arizona, and on 2 March he signed a two-year deal with the club. Smith scored on his Kansas City debut in a 4–0 win over D.C. United.

While still under contract to Sporting Kansas City, Smith left in June 2011, eventually trialing in Spain with Real Zaragoza in July. Kansas City declined to transfer him, however.

Chivas USA
On 21 November 2011, Sporting Kansas City traded Smith's rights to Chivas USA in exchange for two 2012 MLS Supplemental Draft picks.

Xanthi
Smith signed with Greek club Skoda Xanthi on 29 December 2012.

Career statistics
(correct as of 30 March 2010)

Personal
Smith's father is American, from Alaska and his mother is of English heritage, with his grandparents hailing from Montego Bay. He first attended St. Aloysius College secondary school, which was attended by West Ham United midfielder Joe Cole, before moving on to Highams Park School, where he was a classmate of Jamie O'Hara.

References

External links

 Official website: www.ryansmith11.com

1986 births
Footballers from Archway, London
Living people
Association football midfielders
English footballers
English expatriate footballers
Arsenal F.C. players
Derby County F.C. players
Leicester City F.C. players
Millwall F.C. players
Southampton F.C. players
Crystal Palace F.C. players
Sporting Kansas City players
Chivas USA players
Xanthi F.C. players
English Football League players
Major League Soccer players
Super League Greece players
Black British sportsmen
England youth international footballers
Expatriate soccer players in the United States
Expatriate footballers in Greece
English expatriate sportspeople in the United States